Gilgit is the capital city of Gilgit–Baltistan, Pakistan. The city is located in a broad valley near the confluence of the Gilgit River and the Hunza River. It is a major tourist destination in Pakistan, serving as a hub for trekking and mountaineering expeditions in the Karakoram mountain range.

Gilgit was once a major centre for Buddhism; it was an important stop on the ancient Silk Road, and today serves as a major junction along the Karakoram Highway with road connections to China as well as the Pakistani cities of Skardu, Chitral, Peshawar, and Islamabad. Currently, it serves as a frontier station for the local tribal areas. The city's economic activity is mainly focused on agriculture, with wheat, maize, and barley as the mainly-produced crops.

Etymology
The city's ancient name was Sargin, later to be known as Gilit, and it is still referred to as Gilit or Sargin-Gilit by the local people. The native Khowar and Wakhi-speaking people refer to the city as Gilt, and in Burushaski, it is called Geelt.

History

Early history
Brogpas trace their settlement from Gilgit into the fertile villages of Ladakh through a rich corpus of hymns, songs, and folklore that have been passed down through generations. The Dards and Shinas appear in many of the old Pauranic lists of people who lived in the region, with the former also mentioned in Ptolemy's accounts of the region.

Buddhist era

Gilgit was an important city on the Silk Road, along which Buddhism spread from South Asia to the rest of Asia. It is considered a Buddhism corridor, along which many Chinese monks came to Kashmir, to learn and to preach Buddhism. Two famous Chinese Buddhist pilgrims, Faxian and Xuanzang, traversed Gilgit, according to their accounts.

According to Chinese records, in the 600s and 700s, the city was governed by a Buddhist dynasty referred to as Little Balur or Lesser Bolü. They are believed to have been the Patola Shahis dynasty mentioned in a Brahmi inscription, and are devout adherents of Vajrayana Buddhism.

In mid-600s, Gilgit came under Chinese suzerainty after the fall of the Western Turkic Khaganate to the Tang military campaigns in the region. In the late 600s CE, the rising Tibetan Empire wrested control of the region from the Chinese. However, faced with growing influence of the Umayyad Caliphate and then the Abbasid Caliphate to the west, the Tibetans were forced to ally themselves with the Islamic caliphates. The region was then contested by the Chinese and Tibetan forces, and their respective vassal states, until the mid-700s. Chinese records of the region continue until late the 700s, at which time the Tangs' western military campaign was weakened due to the An Lushan Rebellion.

Control of the region was left to the Tibetan Empire. They referred to the region as Bruzha, a toponym that is consistent with the ethnonym "Burusho" used today. Tibetan control of the region lasted until the late 800s CE.

Gilgit manuscripts
This corpus of manuscripts was discovered in 1931 in Gilgit, containing many Buddhist texts such as four sutras from the Buddhist canon, including the famous Lotus Sutra. The manuscripts were written on birch bark in the Buddhist form of Sanskrit in the Sharada script. They cover a wide range of themes such as iconometry, folk tales, philosophy, medicine and several related areas of life and general knowledge.

The Gilgit manuscripts
are included in the UNESCO Memory of the World register. They are among the oldest manuscripts in the world, and the oldest manuscript collection surviving in Pakistan, having major significance in Buddhist studies and the evolution of Asian and Sanskrit literature. The manuscripts are believed to have been written in the 5th to 6th centuries AD, though more manuscripts were discovered from the succeeding centuries, which were also classified as Gilgit manuscripts.

Many of the original manuscripts from Gilgit can be found in the National Archives of India and the Pratap Singh Museum in Srinigar. Two manuscripts collected by the orientalist Sir Aurel Stein are in the British Library in London. They include a rare paper version of the Lotus Sutra.

As of 6 October 2014, one source claims that the part of the collection deposited at the Sri Pratap Singh Museum in Srinagar was irrecoverably destroyed during the 2014 India–Pakistan floods.

Pre-Trakhàn

Trakhàn Dynasty

Gilgit was ruled for centuries by the local Trakhàn Dynasty, which ended about 1810 with the death of Raja Abas, the last Trakhàn Raja. The rulers of Hunza and Nager also claim origin with the Trakhàn dynasty. They claim descent from a heroic Kayani Prince of Persia, Azur Jamshid (also known as Shamsher), who secretly married the daughter of the king Shri Badat.

She conspired with him to overthrow her cannibal father. Sri Badat's faith is theorised as Hindu by some and Buddhist by others. However, considering the region's Buddhist heritage, with the most recent influence being Islam, the most likely preceding influence of the region is Buddhism.

Prince Azur Jamshid succeeded in overthrowing King Badat who was known as the Adam Khor (literally "man-eater"), often demanding a child a day from his subjects, his demise is still celebrated to this very day by locals in traditional annual celebrations. In the beginning of the new year, where a Juniper procession walks along the river, in memory of chasing the cannibal king Sri Badat away.

Azur Jamshid abdicated after 16 years of rule in favour of his wife Nur Bakht Khatùn until their son and heir Garg, grew of age and assumed the title of Raja and ruled, for 55 years. The dynasty flourished under the name of the Kayani dynasty until 1421 when Raja Torra Khan assumed rulership. He ruled as a memorable king until 1475. He distinguished his family line from his stepbrother Shah Rais Khan (who fled to the king of Badakshan, and with whose help he gained Chitral from Raja Torra Khan), as the now-known dynastic name of Trakhàn. The descendants of Shah Rais Khan were known as the Ra'issiya Dynasty.

1800s

The area had been a flourishing tract but prosperity was destroyed by warfare over the next fifty years, and by the great flood of 1841 in which the river Indus was blocked by a landslip below the Hatu Pir and the valley was turned into a lake. After the death of Abas, Sulaiman Shah, Raja of Yasin, conquered Gilgit. Then, Azad Khan, Raja of Punial, killed Sulaiman Shah, taking Gilgit; then Tahir Shah, Raja of Buroshall (Nagar), took Gilgit and killed Azad Khan.

Tair Shah's son Shah Sakandar inherited, only to be killed by Gohar Aman, Raja of Yasin of the Khushwakhte Dynasty when he took Gilgit. Then in 1842, Shah Sakandar's brother, Karim Khan, expelled Yasin rulers with the support of a Sikh army from Kashmir. The Sikh general, Nathu Shah, left garrison troops and Karim Khan ruled until Gilgit was ceded to Gulab Singh of Jammu and Kashmir in 1846 by the Treaty of Amritsar, and Dogra troops replaced the Sikh in Gilgit.

Nathu Shah and Karim Khan both transferred their allegiance to Gulab Singh, continuing local administration. When Hunza attacked in 1848, both of them were killed. Gilgit fell to the Hunza and their Yasin and Punial allies but was soon reconquered by Gulab Singh's Dogra troops. With the support of Raja Gohar Aman, Gilgit's inhabitants drove their new rulers out in an uprising in 1852. Raja Gohar Aman then ruled Gilgit until his death in 1860, just before new Dogra forces from Ranbir Singh, son of Gulab Singh, captured the fort and town.

In the 1870s Chitral was threatened by Afghans, Maharaja Ranbir Singh was firm in protecting Chitral from Afghans, the Mehtar of Chitral asked for help. In 1876 Chitral accepted the authority of Jammu Clan and in reverse get the protection from the Dogras who have in the past took part in many victories over Afghans during the time of Gulab Singh Dogra.

British Raj

In 1877, in order to guard against the advance of Russia, the British India Government, acting as the suzerain power of the princely state of Jammu and Kashmir, established the Gilgit Agency. The Agency was re-established under control of the British Resident in Jammu and Kashmir. It comprised the Gilgit Wazarat; the State of Hunza and Nagar; the Punial Jagir; the Governorships of Yasin, Kuh-Ghizr and Ishkoman, and Chilas.

The Tajiks of Xinjiang sometimes enslaved the Gilgiti and Kunjuti Hunza.

In 1935, the British India government demanded from the Jammu and Kashmir state to lease them Gilgit town plus most of the Gilgit Agency and the hill-states Hunza, Nagar, Yasin and Ishkoman for 60 years.

Abdullah Sahib was an Arain and belonged to Chimkor Sahib village of Ambala district Punjab, British India. Abdullah Sahib was the first Muslim governor of the Gilgit in British time period and was close associate of Maharaja Partap Singh.

Khan Bahadur Kalay Khan, a Mohammed Zai Pathan, was the Governor of Gilgit Hunza and Kashmir before partition.

1947 Kashmir war
On 26 October 1947, Maharaja Hari Singh of Jammu and Kashmir, faced with a tribal invasion by Pakistan due to Masscre of Muslims in Jammu by Hindus and Sikh mobs, signed the Instrument of Accession, joining India. It is to be noted that the tribal invasion by Pakistan was not simply a tribal invasion. Pakistani Major General Akbar Khan has given account of the invasion in his book Raiders in Kashmir. General Akbar Khan, then serving as a colonel in the Pakistan army, has described at least four meetings with Prime Minister Liaquat Ali Khan to discuss the planning and conduct of the operations. Justice Muhammad Yusuf Saraf, at the time a Muslim Conference activist, has pointed out that such a major operation could not have been launched without Jinnah's knowledge and approval. The 'Azad Forces' that were part of the so-called tribal invasion were led by Pakistan army officers, and the UNCIP report records Pakistan's admission that they were under Pakistan's 'tactical command'.

Gilgit's military leaders did not favour the State's accession to India. However, there was also written evidence of Gilgit troop leaders wanting to set up an independent Islamic state. Major William Brown in his book Gilgit Rebellion describes the Gilgit troop leaders stating, "We know of course that you are loyal to Pakistan-all Britishers are-but it is not our intention to join Pakistan. We intend to set up an independent Islamic State called the United States of Gilgit, and although we shall keep the friendliest relation with Pakistan we shall in no way owe allegiance to that dominion." The military leaders of the Frontier Districts Province (modern day Gilgit-Baltistan) wanted to join Pakistan. Sensing their discontent, Major William Brown, the Maharaja's commander of the Gilgit Scouts, mutinied on 1 November 1947, overthrowing the Governor Ghansara Singh. The bloodless coup d'etat was planned by Brown to the last detail under the code name "Datta Khel", which was also joined by a rebellious section of the Jammu and Kashmir 6th Infantry under Mirza Hassan Khan. Brown ensured that the treasury was secured and minorities were protected. A provisional government (Aburi Hakoomat) was established by the Gilgit locals with Raja Shah Rais Khan as the president and Mirza Hassan Khan as the commander-in-chief. However, Major Brown had already telegraphed Khan Abdul Qayyum Khan asking Pakistan to take over. The Pakistani political agent, Khan Mohammad Alam Khan, arrived on 16 November and took over the administration of Gilgit. Brown outmaneuvered the pro-Independence group and secured the approval of the mirs and rajas for accession to Pakistan. Browns's actions surprised the British Government.

The provisional government lasted 16 days. The provisional government lacked sway over the population. The Gilgit rebellion did not have civilian involvement and was solely the work of military leaders, not all of whom had been in favor of joining Pakistan, at least in the short term. Historian Ahmed Hasan Dani mentions that although there was lack of public participation in the rebellion, sentiments were intense in the civilian population and their anti-Kashmiri sentiments were also clear. According to various scholars, the people of Gilgit as well as those of Chilas, Koh Ghizr, Ishkoman, Yasin, Punial, Hunza and Nagar joined Pakistan by choice.

Geography

Gilgit is situated in a valley formed by the confluence of the Indus River, Hunza River and Gilgit River.

Climate
Gilgit experiences a cold desert climate (Köppen climate classification BWk). Weather conditions for Gilgit are dominated by its geographical location, a valley in a mountainous area, southwest of Karakoram range. The prevalent season of Gilgit is winter, occupying the valley eight to nine months a year.

Gilgit lacks significant rainfall, averaging in  annually, as monsoon breaks against the southern range of Himalayas. Irrigation for land cultivation is obtained from the rivers, abundant with melting snow water from higher altitudes.

As a result of this extremity in the weather, landslides and avalanches are frequent in the area.

Climate Change Effects

Climate change has adversely effected this region with more rains every year. On 26 August 2022, most villages in Ghizer district and Hunza were severely effected by the ongoing flooding displacing many people.

Administration
The city of Gilgit constitutes a tehsil within Gilgit District. Gilgit District itself is the part of the larger Gilgit Division which is headed by a Commissioner of BPS-20 belonging to Pakistan Administrative service. The Current Commissioner Gilgit Division is Mr Najeem Alam (PAS).

Transportation

Air
Gilgit is served by the nearby Gilgit Airport, with direct flights to Islamabad. Pakistan International Airlines (PIA) is the only airline operating in Gilgit. The Government of Pakistan is planning to build a new international standard airport in Gilgit to meet the requirements of international tourists and demand from domestic investors.

Road

The roadway is being upgraded as part of the China–Pakistan Economic Corridor. The KKH connects Gilgit to Chilas, Dasu, Besham, Mansehra, Abbottabad and Islamabad in the south. Gilgit is connected to Karimabad (Hunza) and Sust in the north, with further connections to the Chinese cities of Tashkurgan, Upal and Kashgar in Xinjiang. Gilgit is also linked to Chitral in the west, and Skardu to the east. The road to Skardu will be upgraded to a 4-lane road at a cost of $475 million.

Transport companies such as the Silk Route Transport Pvt, Masherbrum Transport Pvt and Northern Areas Transport Corporation (NATCO), offer passenger road transport between Islamabad, Gilgit, Sust, and Kashgar and Tashkurgan in China.

The Astore-Burzil Pass Road, linking Gilgit to Srinagar was closed in 1978.

Rail
Gilgit is not served by any rail connections.

Education

 Karakoram International University Gilgit
Public Schools and Colleges Jutial Gilgit
 Aga Khan Higher Secondary School Gilgit

Basic facilities

Gilgit has not received a gas pipeline infrastructure since Pakistan's independence, unlike other cities. Through the importation of gas cylinders from other provinces, many private gas contractors offer gas cylinders. The LPG (Liquefied Petroleum Gas) Air Mix Plant project by Sui Northern Gas Pipelines Limited was unveiled in 2020, with the goal of bringing the gas facility to Gilgit. This will significantly reduce deforestation, as the public now uses wood from trees for heating and lighting purpose. The first head office has been built in Gilgit.

Sister cities
 Skardu, Baltistan
 Kashgar, China (since May 2009)

See also
Chamogarh
Gilgit District
Karakoram Highway

References

Citations

General sources

External links

 Official Website of the Gilgit Baltistan Tourism Department 
Official Website of the Government of Gilgit Baltistan 
Gilgit Nomination, UNESCO, the Memory of the World Register entry document
Britannica Gilgit

 
Capitals of Pakistan
History of Buddhism in Pakistan
Populated places in Gilgit District
Populated places along the Silk Road
Karakoram
Cities in Pakistan